Teede is a surname. Notable people with the surname include:

 Andra Teede (born 1988), Estonian writer
 Gaye Teede (born 1946), Australian netball player and coach